Harcourt is a commune in the Eure department in the Normandy region in northern France.

Population

Sights
Château d'Harcourt - a medieval castle with the oldest arboretum in France: the Arboretum d'Harcourt

See also
Communes of the Eure department

References

External links

 Image of the gallery (in French)
 A visionary in the trees at Château d'Harcourt – how Lois-Gervais Delamarre, survivor of the French revolution, started the amazing arboretum at the chateau

Communes of Eure